The 1998 European Promotion Cup for Men was the 6th edition of this tournament. It was hosted in Gibraltar and Andorra won its first title ever.

Standings

External links
FIBA Archive

1998
1997–98 in European basketball
International basketball competitions hosted by Gibraltar
1998 in Gibraltar